Eeramana Rojave 2 is a 2022 Indian-Tamil Love drama airing on Star Vijay. The series stars Gabriella Charlton, Dhiraviam Rajakumaran, Siddharth Kumaran and Swathi Konde. The series serves a Sequel to the 2018 series of the same name. The show premiered on 17 January 2022, is also telecast on the digital platform Disney+ Hotstar.

Plot
The following story is about Jeeva and Kaviya, who are lovers. Jeeva's brother and Kaviya's sister were going to get married, but there happens to be a mix up. This results in Kaviya marrying Jeeva's brother and Jeeva marrying Kavya's sister.

Cast

Main
 Dhiraviyam Rajakumaran as Jeeva; Priya's husband, Kavya's ex-boyfriend, and, Parthiban's younger brother.
 Siddharth Kumaran as Parthiban; Ramya's fiance, Kavya's husband, Priya's ex-fiancé, and, Jeeva's elder brother.
 Swathi Konde as Priya; Jeeva's wife, Parthiban's ex-fiancé, and, Kavya's elder sister.
 Gabriella Charlton as Kaviya;  Parthiban's wife, Jeeva's ex-girlfriend, and, Priya's younger sister.

Recurring
 Aarthi Ramkumar as Devi, Arunachalam's elder sister and Ramya's mother
 Chandhini Prakash as Ramya, Devi's daughter, Parthiban's obsessive one-sided love interest and JK's love interest
 Dinesh Gopalsamy as JK, Devi's nephew, who one-sided ly loves Ramya
 Deepak Kumar as Arjun, Arunachalam and Parvathi's youngest son. Parthiban and Jeeva's youngest brother, Sakthi's love interest
 Shravnitha Srikanth as Sakthi, Duraisamy and Mahalakshimi's youngest daughter. Priya and Kavya's youngest sister, Arjun's love interest
 V.Dasarathy / Ramnath Shetty / V.Dasarathy as Arunachalam, Parthiban, Jeeva and Arjun's father and Parvathy husband
 Meena Vemuri as Parvathy, Parthiban, Jeeva and Arjun's mother and Arunachalam wife 
 Manohar Krishnan / Prakash Rajan as Duraisamy, Priya, Kavya and Sakthi's father and Mahalakshmi husband
 Kiruba as Mahalakshmi, Priya, Kavya and Sakthi's mother and  Duraisamy wife
 Sunitha as Meera, A girl who wished to marry Parthiban later his arch-rival
 Preethi Kumar as Aishwarya, Manjula's first daughter and Anitha elder sister
 Rajeshwari as Manjula , Arunachalam's younger sister and Aishu and Anitha's mother 
 Sivan Srinivasan as Bhaskar: Meera's father
 Kanishka as Anitha: Aishu's younger sister
 Kammapandi as Bhoothapandi: Mahalakshmi's elder brother
 Praveen Devasagayam as Azhagar: Bhoothapandi's elder son

Guest
 Minnal Deepa as Valarmathi: Meera's mother

Production

Casting
The second season stars Dhiraviam Rajakumaran, who played Vetrivel Naatarasan in the first season, was also play in the second season of this series. Gabriella Charlton was cast as Kavya, Thaenmozhi B.A fame Siddharth Kumaran was cast as Parthiban and Kannada television actress Swathi Konde was cast as Priya, were selected for leads.

Release
The first promo was unveiled on December-end 2021, featuring the cast members. The second promo was unveiled in January 2022, featuring the protagonists and revealing the release date. The first episode aired on 17 January 2022 replacing Bigg Boss Tamil 5.

References

External links 
 Eeramana Rojave 2 on Hotstar

Star Vijay original programming
Tamil-language romance television series
2022 Tamil-language television series debuts
Tamil-language television soap operas
2022 Tamil-language television seasons
Tamil-language sequel television series
Television shows set in Tamil Nadu
Tamil-language television shows